Caroline Wozniacki was the defending champion, but lost in the third round to Aryna Sabalenka in a rematch of the previous year's final.

Karolína Plíšková reached her third Eastbourne final in four years, and claimed her second title, defeating Angelique Kerber in the final 6–1, 6–4.

Seeds
The top eight seeds received a bye into the second round.

Draw

Finals

Top half

Section 1

Section 2

Bottom half

Section 3

Section 4

Qualifying

Seeds

Qualifiers

Lucky losers

Draw

First qualifier

Second qualifier

Third qualifier

Fourth qualifier

Fifth qualifier

Sixth qualifier

References

Main draw
Qualifying draw

Eastbourne International - Singles
2019 Women's Singles